Cathy Davis (born c. 1952) is an American former professional boxer who competed between 1976 and 1981. Some of her fights were fixed.

Career
Davis sued the New York State Athletic Commission (NYSAC) in 1977 because she was denied a boxing license because she was a woman, and the case was decided in her favor later that year, with the judge 
invalidating New York State rule number 205.15, which stated, “No woman may be licensed as a boxer or second or licensed to compete in any wrestling exhibition with men.” In his opinion the judge cited the precedent set by Garrett v. New York State Athletic Commission (1975), which “found the regulation invalid under the equal protection clauses of the State and Federal Constitutions”. The NYSAC filed an appeal of the ruling, but later dropped it.

In August 1978 Davis became the first, and, until Ronda Rousey in January 2016, the only woman to be on the cover of The Ring.

On September 19, 1978, Davis received the NYSAC’s first boxing license given to a female boxer.

Cat Davis did not only fight in New York. She fought between 1976 and 1981, in various areas of the country, including Nevada, California, and much of the Northwest. She became popular throughout the country by often fighting on television.

It was eventually revealed that some of her fights had been fixed.

Partial boxing record
Officially, her first fight occurred on November 11, 1977, when she knocked out Margie Dunson in the first round, in North Carolina. On June 7, 1978, she and Ernestine Jones fought to a no contest in a bout that was scheduled for four rounds. On July 2, 1979, she knocked out Uschi Doering in the Exposition Building, in Portland, Maine, in 6 rounds.

Professional boxing record

References

Bibliography
A History of Women's Boxing, Malissa Smith, Rowman & Littlefield Publishers, 2014, 
THE GREAT WHITE HYPE By Jack Newfield - Published November 1979 Volume. One - Originally printed in the VOICE Vol. XXIII No. 41 "The Weekly Newspaper of New York, October 16, 1978

External links
 

1952 births
Living people
People from Winnfield, Louisiana
American women boxers
Boxers from Louisiana
Lightweight boxers
Welterweight boxers
American expatriate sportspeople in South Africa
21st-century American women